Punwar is a village in the Karmala taluka of Solapur district in Maharashtra state, India.

Demographics
Covering  and comprising 378 households at the time of the 2011 census of India, Punwar had a population of 1904. There were 988 males and 916 females, with 241 people being aged six or younger.

References

Villages in Karmala taluka